Andrew James Harris (born 26 June 1973), commonly known as A. J. Harris, is a former English first-class cricketer. A right-arm medium-pace bowler and a right-handed batsman, Harris made more than 120 appearances, taking over 400 wickets at an average of just over 31.

Biography 
Born 26 June 1973 in Ashton-under-Lyne, Lancashire, Harris turned professional in 1993, making his first-class and List A debuts for Derbyshire County Cricket Club that summer. In the 1996 season Harris played well, as his team challenged for the County Championship. His performance led to a place on the England A tour to Australia the following winter. The tour was successful, but this was the peak of Harris's achievements. He was affected by various injuries, causing him to be unable to string a run of games together.

In 2000, Harris moved to Nottinghamshire, where he continued to show his ability despite spells on the sidelines. In 2003 against Durham UCCE, Harris became the fourth player in the history of first-class cricket to be given out timed out. Harris was a key member of Nottinghamshire's Championship-winning side of 2005, taking 49 wickets. He was awarded a benefit year by the club for 2008.

In 2006, he along with Chris Read holds the highest 9th wicket partnership in List A cricket history (155)

In June 2008, he joined Gloucestershire to bring some experience to bolster the performances of an under-performing seam attack. He joined for a loan period that will include the Cheltenham Festival later in the summer.
He ended the season by making a number of appearances for Worcestershire.
He signed for Leicestershire in 2009 and made his debut against Northamptonshire.

He is married to Kate and they have two sons, Jacob and Max.

References

External links

Player Profile, ECB.
https://web.archive.org/web/20080719172424/http://www.ajharrisbenefit08.co.uk/ AJ Harris benefit year 2008

1973 births
Living people
Cricketers from Ashton-under-Lyne
Derbyshire cricketers
English cricketers
Gloucestershire cricketers
Leicestershire cricketers
NBC Denis Compton Award recipients
Nottinghamshire cricketers
Staffordshire cricketers
Worcestershire cricketers